The Trufflers is a 1917 American silent drama film directed by Fred E. Wright and starring Nell Craig, Sidney Ainsworth and Ernest Maupain.

Cast
 Nell Craig as Sue Wilde 
 Sidney Ainsworth as Peter Ericson Mann 
 Ernest Maupain as Jacob Zanin 
 Richard Travers as Henry Bates 
 Patrick Calhoun as Hy Lowe 
 Harry Dunkinson as Abe Silverstone 
 John Cossar as Dr. Hubbell Harkness 
 Virginia Bowker as Betty Deane

References

Bibliography
 Langman, Larry. American Film Cycles: The Silent Era. Greenwood Publishing, 1998.

External links
 

1917 films
1917 drama films
1910s English-language films
American silent feature films
Silent American drama films
Films directed by Fred E. Wright
American black-and-white films
Essanay Studios films
1910s American films